Franco Cavallo (26 September 1932 – 9 January 2022) was an Italian competitive sailor and Olympic medalist. He won a bronze medal in the Star class at the 1968 Summer Olympics in Mexico City in team with Camillo Gargano. Cavallo died in Naples on 9 January 2022, at the age of 89.

References

External links
 

1932 births
2022 deaths
Italian male sailors (sport)
Sailors at the 1968 Summer Olympics – Star
Olympic sailors of Italy
Olympic bronze medalists for Italy
Olympic medalists in sailing
Medalists at the 1968 Summer Olympics
Sportspeople from Naples